The 6th Infantry Division (6. Infanterie-Division) was a unit of the German Army during World War II.

History 
Formed in October 1934 from Infanterieführer VI in Bielefeld, the division was mobilized on 26 August 1939 for the upcoming invasion of Poland. At that time, it consisted of the usual German infantry division elements: three infantry regiments of three battalions each, one three-battalion regiment of light artillery, one battalion of heavy artillery (from a separate artillery  regiment, but attached to the particular division), a Panzerjäger (anti-tank) Battalion, a reconnaissance (Aufklärungs) Battalion, a Signals Battalion, a Pioneer (Engineer) Battalion, and divisional supply, medical, and administrative units.

When the Soviets launched Operation Bagration on 23 June 1944, the division was surrounded during the Bobruysk Offensive and completely destroyed.

6th (Volks) Grenadier Division  
On 25 July 1944, the division was recreated 6. Grenadier-Division from the 552th Grenadier-Division which was still in formation. It was renamed in 6. Volksgrenadier-Division on 9 October 1944. The division was destroyed during the Soviet Vistula–Oder Offensive in January 1945 and reestablished as 6. Infanterie-Division (10 March 1945) using elements of Shadow Division Dresden.

Commanding officers
 General der Pioniere Walter Kuntze, 15 May 1935
 Generalleutnant Arnold Freiherr von Biegeleben, 1 March 1938
 Generalleutnant Helge Auleb, 14 October 1940
 Generalleutnant Horst Großmann, 25 January 1942
 Generalleutnant Egon von Neindorff, 16 December 1943
 Oberst Alexander Conrady, 12 January 1944
 Oberst Günther Klammt, 19 January 1944
 Generalleutnant Hans-Walter Heyne, 1 June 1944
 Generalleutnant Otto-Hermann Brücker, until 4 May 1945
 Generalmajor Friedrich-Wilhelm Liegmann, 4 May 1945

References
Burkhard Müller-Hillebrand: Das Heer 1933–1945. Entwicklung des organisatorischen Aufbaues.  Vol.III: Der Zweifrontenkrieg. Das Heer vom Beginn des Feldzuges gegen die Sowjetunion bis zum Kriegsende. Mittler: Frankfurt am Main 1969, p. 285.
 Georg Tessin: Verbände und Truppen der  deutschen Wehrmacht und Waffen-SS im Zweiten Weltkrieg, 1939 – 1945. Vol. III: Die Landstreitkräfte 6 – 14.  Mittler: Frankfurt am Main 1967.

0*006
Military units and formations established in 1934
1934 establishments in Germany
Military units and formations disestablished in 1945